The 2016 OEC Taipei WTA Challenger was a professional tennis tournament played on indoor hard courts. It was the 9th edition of the tournament and part of the 2016 WTA 125K series, offering a total of $115,000 in prize money. It took place in Taipei, Taiwan, on 14–20 November 2016.

Singles main draw entrants

Seeds 

 1 Rankings as of 7 November 2016.

Other entrants 
The following player received a wildcard into the singles main draw:
  Vitalia Diatchenko
  Hsu Chieh-yu
  Hsu Ching-wen
  Lee Ya-hsuan
  Kristina Mladenovic (withdrew)

The following players received entry from the qualifying draw:
  Ashleigh Barty
  Lee Pei-chi
  Junri Namigata
  Varatchaya Wongteanchai

The following player received entry by a lucky loser spot:
  Kyōka Okamura

Doubles entrants

Seeds 

 1 Rankings as of 7 November 2016.

Other entrants 
The following pair received a wildcard into the doubles main draw:
  Cho I-hsuan /  Tatjana Maria

Champions

Singles

 Evgeniya Rodina def.  Chang Kai-chen, 6–4, 6–3

Doubles

 Natela Dzalamidze /  Veronika Kudermetova def.  Chang Kai-chen /  Chuang Chia-jung, 4–6, 6–3, [10–5]

External links 
 Official website 

2016 WTA 125K series
2016 in Taiwanese tennis
Tennis tournaments in Taiwan
2016 in Taiwanese women's sport